Men in Hope is a 2011 Czech romantic sex comedy film written and directed by Jiří Vejdělek.

Plot
Ondřej (Jiří Macháček), a timid and reserved man, is in a monotonous marriage with Alice (Petra Hřebíčková). On the contrary, his promiscuous father-in-law Rudolf (Bolek Polívka) who lives next door has a happy marriage of 35 years with Marta (Simona Stašová). As Ondřej's marriage gets increasingly boring, Rudolf encourages Ondřej to imitate him to save his marriage. Ondřej rejects it but he changes his mind after he meets Šarlota (Vica Kerekes), a new date of Rudolf.

Cast
Jiří Macháček as Ondřej
Bolek Polívka as Rudolf
Petra Hřebíčková as Alice
Vica Kerekes as Šarlota
Simona Stašová as Marta
Lukáš Langmajer as Louis
Hynek Čermák as Masér
Filip Antonio as Pavlík
Michal Novotný as číšník v Café Max
Jitka Čvančarová as průvodkyně
Eliška Křenková as Irena
Emma Smetana as Bára
Berenika Kohoutová as mladá Marta
Václav Jílek as mladý Rudolf

Reception
Kamil Fila said that, "It is difficult to say when the trend began in Czech cinema with the stream of sexual innuendos replacing a coherent plot, but Men in Hope represents its peak so far." Other critics praised the films and Kerekes's performance.

References

External links
 

2011 films
2011 romantic comedy films
2010s sex comedy films
2010s Czech-language films
Adultery in films
Czech romantic comedy films